Acanthodactylus opheodurus, also known commonly as Arnold's fringe-fingered lizard or the snake-tailed fringe-toed lizard, is a species of lizard in the family Lacertidae. The species is endemic to the Middle East.

Geographic range

A. opheodurus is found in Iraq, Israel, Jordan, Kuwait, Oman, Qatar, Saudi Arabia, United Arab Emirates, and Yemen.

Reproduction
A. opheodurus is oviparous.

References

Further reading
Arnold EN (1980). "The Reptiles and Amphibians of Dhofar, Southern Arabia". Journal of Oman Studies. Special Report No. 2: 273–332. (Acanthodactylus opheodurus, new species, p. 296). 
Cunningham, Peter Low (2001). "Notes on some aspects of the ecology of Acanthodactylus opheodurus Arnold, 1980, from the United Arab Emirates (Squamata: Sauria: Lacertidae)". Herpetozoa (Vienna) 14 (1/2): 15–20. (in English, with an abstract in German).
Werner, Yehudah L.; Gajst, Oren; Talbi, Roy; Bouskila, Amos (2012). "Acanthodactylus opheodurus Arnold, 1980 in the Levant revisited, and the striped patterns of Levantine Acanthodactylus (Reptilia: Lacertidae)". Zoology in the Middle East 56: 31–38.

Acanthodactylus
Reptiles described in 1980
Taxa named by Edwin Nicholas Arnold